Watkin Williams (1742?  30 November 1808), of Penbedw, near Flint, Denbighshire and Erbistock, Flintshire, was a Welsh politician and administrator.

Life
Williams was the son of Richard Williams, MP and Annabella Lloyd from Drenewydd. He was educated at Brasenose College, Oxford.

Career
Williams was the Member of Parliament for Montgomeryshire 9 June 1772 – 1774 and Flint Boroughs 26 June 1777 – 1806.

He was Lord Lieutenant of Merionethshire from August 1789 to June 1793, Lord Lieutenant of Denbighshire from 1792 to 1793 and Constable of Flint Castle from March 1799 to his death. He was also a Major in the Salop militia (1766–96) and the Flintshire fusiliers (1803).

He died in 1808. He had married Elizabeth Stapleton, the daughter of Colonel James Russell Stapleton from Bodrhyddan, Flintshire but had no children.

References

1742 births
1808 deaths
People from Birkenhead
Members of the Parliament of England for Denbighshire
People from Wrexham
People from Flintshire
Alumni of Brasenose College, Oxford
Members of the Parliament of Great Britain for Welsh constituencies
British MPs 1768–1774
British MPs 1774–1780
British MPs 1780–1784
British MPs 1784–1790
British MPs 1790–1796
British MPs 1796–1800
Members of the Parliament of the United Kingdom for Welsh constituencies
UK MPs 1801–1802
UK MPs 1802–1806
19th-century Welsh politicians